A corsage  is a small bouquet of flowers worn on a woman's dress or around her wrist for a formal occasion. They are typically given to her by her date. Today, corsages are most commonly seen at homecomings, proms, and similar formal events.

In some countries, similar ornaments are worn by the mothers and grandmothers of the bride and groom at a wedding ceremony.

Flowers worn by men are generally called buttonholes or boutonnières. At school events such as homecoming or prom, couples generally coordinate the corsage and boutonnière, signifying their connection, and distinguishing them from others. In some cases, young girls may wear a corsage to a father-daughter dance, and the father may also wear a boutonnière.

History 

Wearing flowers pinned to clothing dates as far back as Ancient Greece, when small bunches of fragrant flowers and herbs were worn at weddings to ward off evil spirits. During the 16th and 17th centuries, corsages and boutonnieres may have been a part of daily life to prevent disease and to ward off evil spirits, but over time, they became special-occasion pieces.

The word corsage comes from the French term bouquet de corsage, meaning a bouquet of flowers worn on upper part of the body ("corsage" meaning girdle, bodice in French), which was traditionally worn by women to weddings and funerals. Eventually, the term shortened to corsage in American English. In the early 19th century, corsages were regarded as a courting gift and were often given at formal dances. Traditionally, the gentleman would bring a gift of flowers for his date's parents and would select one of the flowers to give to his date, which would then be carried or attached to her clothing, usually on the front of the shoulder. During the 1950s, some corsages were made with fruit and would be seen on hats for decoration. As dress styles changed, pinning the corsage to the dress became impractical, and wrist corsages became the norm. 

Today's corsages are similar to those made in previous decades, though generally smaller. It is still customary for someone to give their female date a corsage when attending a formal dance, but they are also sometimes given to a daughter attending a formal event by her parents or worn by the mothers and grandmothers of the bride and groom at a wedding. Wives and any surviving mothers typically wear corsages at Anniversary celebrations; generally, the flowers are the same as what was used at the wedding, with ribbons indicating the milestone, (i.e. silver for 25th, red for 40th). Florists recommend that the flowers be complementary in color to the attire, and corsages and boutonnières should be coordinated to indicate that a couple is attending the event together. Corsages are often dried and pressed to be preserved as mementos.

Homecoming and prom 

When attending a school formal or prom, providing a corsage for a prom date signifies consideration and generosity, as the corsage is meant to symbolize and honor the person wearing it. Corsages are usually worn around a prom date's wrist; alternatively, they may be pinned on her dress or a modified nosegay can be carried in her hand. The colors of the flowers are usually chosen to complement the dress or to add color to the couple, creating a unifying look. Prom couples may wish to go together to choose the flowers for a custom-made corsage or boutonnière. Traditionally, the male presents a corsage or nosegay to the female as a gift, while the female would provide the boutonnière and pin it on the male's shirt or jacket.

Types 
Corsages can be made from a single flower or a small bunch of flowers, and a variety of flowers can be used. The following table shows some of the main flowers and accents used to create a custom-made corsage and that can be included in a nosegay and boutonnière.

Tools 
The style and design of a corsage may vary depending on the event. Younger generations tend to use wrist corsages, which may vary in style and size depending on the wearer. The more traditional option is a corsage pinned on the shoulder of a woman's dress. This style often gets confused with a boutonnière. The main difference is the size and the number of flowers used.

If a wrist corsage is chosen for an event, it can be made using wire and floral tape or floral glue. The wire method is recommended for pin-on corsages because the wire will support the stems or flower bulbs. Glue can be added to hold the flowers together if the wire and tape are not sufficient.

See also 

 Boutonnière
 Floristry
 Nosegay

References 

Fashion accessories
Floristry